The  was a short civil war between rival subjects of the cloistered Emperor Go-Shirakawa of Japan in 1160 fought in order to resolve a dispute about political power.  It was preceded by the Hōgen Rebellion in 1156.  Heiji no ran is seen as a direct outcome of the earlier armed dispute; but unlike Hōgen no ran, which was a dispute between members of the same clan, this was rather a struggle for power between two rival clans. It is also seen as a precursor of a broader civil war.

Context
Emperor Go-Shirakawa stepped back from his formal role as emperor, but his abdication implied no cession of political or other powers to his successor.

 September 5, 1158 (Hōgen 3, 11th day of the 8th month): In the 3rd year of Go-Shirakawa-tennōs reign (後白河天皇25年), the emperor abdicated; and the succession (senso) was received by his eldest son.  Shortly thereafter, Emperor Nijō is said to have acceded to the throne (sokui).

After Nijō was formally enthroned, the management of all affairs continued to rest entirely in the hands of Go-Shirakawa.

In late 1159, Taira no Kiyomori, head of the Taira clan and supporter of Emperor Nijō, left Kyōto with his family, on a personal pilgrimage. This left his enemies, Fujiwara no Nobuyori and the Minamoto clan, a perfect opportunity to effect an uprising.

 January 19 – February 5, 1160 (Heiji 1, 9th–26th day of the 12th month): The Heiji rebellion, also known as the Heiji disturbance or the Heiji insurrection or the Heiji war.

Combat

In the Siege of Sanjō Palace, Nobuyori and his Minamoto allies abducted the former emperor Emperor Go-Shirakawa and Emperor Nijō and set fire to the Palace.

Minamoto no Yoshitomo and Fujiwara no Nobuyori placed Go-Shirakawa and Emperor Nijo under house arrest and killed his retainer, the scholar Fujiwara no Michinori. Nobuyori had himself declared imperial chancellor, and began to see his plans for political power fall into place.

However, the Minamoto did not plan well enough militarily, and were unprepared to defend the city against Kiyomori's return. Upon his return, the Minamoto made no decisive moves and hesitated.

Kiyomori, who returned to Kyōto, made some peace proposals to Nobuyori. However, this was a plot. While Nobuyori was careless, the Emperor Nijō and the former emperor Go-shirakawa escaped to Kiyomori's side.

Kiyomori received an imperial grant from the Emperor for attacking Yoshitomo and Nobuyori. Taira no Shigemori (the eldest son of Kiyomori) led 3,000 cavalry and attacked the Imperial Palace where Yoshitomo and Nobuyori were holed up. Nobuyori ran away immediately, but Minamoto no Yoshihira (the eldest son of Yoshitomo) fought back and a fierce battle ensued. Yoshihira fought hard and chased Shigemori within the Imperial Palace.

The Taira force retreated and the Minamoto force left the Imperial Palace in pursuit. This was a plot of Kiyomori. A detached Taira force occupied the Imperial Palace. The Minamoto force was cut off from the way of retreat. The Minamoto force charged at Rokuhara of a base of Kiyomori. It became a fierce battle, but finally the Minamoto force fled in disorderly retreat.

Outcome
Ultimately, Taira no Kiyomori defeated Yoshitomo.  Yoshitomo was eventually betrayed and killed by a retainer while escaping from Kyōto in Owari.  Yoshitomo's two sons, Minamoto no Tomonaga and Minamoto no Yoshihira were also casualties. However three of his other sons, Yoritomo (then only 13 years old, and future founding Shogun of the Kamakura Shogunate 25 years later), Noriyori and Yoshitsune were spared.

Afterwards, Taira no Kiyomori banished Yoshitomo's son Minamoto no Yoritomo, seized Minamoto wealth and land, and eventually formed the first of four samurai-dominated governments during the feudal history of Japan.

Legacy
The rivalry between the Minamoto and Taira clans was exacerbated by the Heiji rebellion.  This led to the Genpei War, ending with the decisive Taira defeat at the Battle of Dan-no-ura in 1185. 
 
The Kamakura period epic Tale of Heiji is about the exploits of the samurai who participated in the Heiji Rebellion. Together with the Tale of Hōgen and the Tale of Heike, these war stories (gunki monogatari) describe the rise and fall of the Minamoto and Taira samurai clans.

Illustrations
The scroll below, Illustrated Tale of the Heiji Civil War: Scroll of the Imperial Visit to Rokuhara, housed at the Tokyo National Museum, illustrates some events of the Heiji Rebellion.

Notes

References
 Brown, Delmer M. and Ichirō Ishida, eds. (1979).  Gukanshō: The Future and the Past. Berkeley: University of California Press. ;  OCLC 251325323
 Keene, Donald. (1999).  Seeds in the Heart: Japanese Literature from Earliest Times to the Late Sixteenth Century. New York: Columbia University Press. ;   OCLC 246429887
 Kitagawa, Hiroshi and Bruce T. Tsuchida. (1975). The Tale of the Heike. Tokyo: University of Tokyo Press.   OCLC 262297615
 Ponsonby-Fane, Richard Arthur Brabazon. (1959).  The Imperial House of Japan. Kyoto: Ponsonby Memorial Society. OCLC 194887
 Titsingh, Isaac. (1834). Nihon Ōdai Ichiran; ou,  Annales des empereurs du Japon.  Paris: Royal Asiatic Society, Oriental Translation Fund of Great Britain and Ireland.  OCLC 5850691
 Varley, H. Paul. (1980).  Jinnō Shōtōki: A Chronicle of Gods and Sovereigns. New York: Columbia University Press. ;  OCLC 59145842

Rebellions in Japan
1150s in Japan
1159 in Asia
Conflicts in 1160
1160s in Japan
1160 in Asia
Conflicts in 1159
12th-century rebellions
Wars of succession involving the states and peoples of Asia